Alhazen (Ibn al-Haytham) is an 11th-century Arab mathematician and astronomer.
"Alhazen" may also refer to:
Alhazen (crater), a lunar crater
59239 Alhazen, an asteroid

See also
Alhazen's problem